The Municipality of Juan Aldama was named in honor of the insurgent Juan Aldama, who participated alongside Miguel Hidalgo in the Mexican War of Independence. It is also the name of the biggest community in the municipality.

Picture

Cities and Towns 
7 de Marzo            98304
Bosques del Pedregal  98303
El Mezquite           98307
Espiritú Santo        98320
Gral Juan Jose Rios   98310
Jalpa                 98311
Juan Aldama           98300
Las Jarillas          98304
Las Auroras           98303
Magisterial           98307
Nuevo Amanecer        98303
Ojitos de Santa Lucia                98310
Oriente               98303
Valle Verde           98307
Villa Arechiga        98307
Morelos

External links 
wikiJAZ Juan Aldama Zacatecas General Interest wiki 

1591 establishments in North America
1591 in New Spain
Municipalities of Zacatecas